John Young (May 1, 1841 – July 12, 1907) was a Canadian politician. He served in the Legislative Assembly of New Brunswick as a member from Gloucester County.

References 

1841 births
1907 deaths